Mahanubhavudu is a 2017 Indian Telugu-language romantic comedy film written and directed by Maruthi. It features Sharwanand and Mehreen Pirzada in the lead roles.

The film's principal photography commenced on 7 March 2017 and was wrapped on 2 September 2017, and had a worldwide release on 29 September 2017. The movie received positive reviews and was a commercial success.

The film was remade in Odia in 2019 as Ajab Sanju Ra Gajab Love starring Babushan.

Plot
Anand (Sharwanand) is a young man with obsessive compulsive personality disorder (OCD) and is very particular about tidyness. He doesn't even touch others since he is a Mysophobiac and has an unrealistic fear of hospitals since they have infectious patients. He, one day, meets Meghana (Mehreen Pirzada) after an incident involving a man spitting chewing gum on her shoe. He falls in love with her after she tells the man the importance of cleanliness. She later becomes his partner for a company project and eventually falls for him too. She decides to introduce Anand to her father, Ramaraju (Nassar), who has been waiting for his daughter to get married.

Although Meghana's father rejects him at first due to his eccentricities, Anand saves his stolen bag from a bunch of goons and he accepts him as his son-in-law. However at that time, Meghana's father suffers a heart attack. Her father begins vomiting blood onto Anand and Anand drives him to hospital along with Meghana. While driving, Aanand begins to recollect the incident again and again and is nauseated. Unable to hold his vomit, he stops the car by the road and gets down the car to vomit by the road. He then tells Meghana that he can't take her father to the hospital as he is nauseous which shocks her. Meghana takes her father to the hospital instead and breaks up with Anand because of his insistence over things being clean as well as for his selfishness.

In the later half, Anand goes to Meghana's village, as she didn't tell her father about their breakup. In their village, he experiences a lot things which bring out anger and the Mysophobia in him, but he controls his fears and stays for Meghana. In the end, he is pulled into a fight in mud to save the village and get Meghana's trust, which he wins but falls down as soon as the fight is over. The doctor reveals that he just had an infection due to fighting in the mud.

In the end, he is seen asking his son, who shares the same traits of his OCD, to not be obsessive but to enjoy life and they both are seen playing in the rain.

Cast

Sharwanand as Anand
Mehreen Pirzada as Meghana 
Vennela Kishore as Kishore
Nassar as Ramaraju, Meghana's father
Kalyani Natarajan as Anand's mother
Bhadram as Ramaraju's servant
Himaja as Meghana's Friend
Raghu Babu as doctor
Mahadevan as Bhupathi
Rajitha
Duvvasi Mohan
Srinivas Avasarala
Bhanushree
Maruthi in a cameo appearance in song Bhamalu Bhamalu

Soundtrack

Music composed by S. Thaman. The soundtrack was released by Mango Music.

References

External links
 

2010s Telugu-language films
Films shot in Telangana
2010s masala films
Indian romantic comedy films
Telugu films remade in other languages
Films about diseases
2017 romantic comedy films
Films shot in Andhra Pradesh
Films set in Andhra Pradesh
UV Creations films
Films about obsessive–compulsive disorder
Films directed by Maruthi